Mathias Mpuuga is a politician, lawyer, teacher, Member of the Parliament of Uganda, and Leader of Opposition (Uganda).He previously served as a Member of Parliament of Masaka Municipality from 2011 until 2021.

He is the current member of Parliament representing Nyendo - Mukungwe Division. Mpuuga also serves as Deputy President of the National Unity Platform (NUP) Political party led by Bobi Wine.

Biography 
Mpuuga was born on 12 October 1975 to the late Vincent Nsamba and Gertrude Nsamba.

He was born in the present-day Lwengo district in Central Uganda.

Mpuuga went to Kyamaganda Boys Demonstration School for his primary education which he completed in 1987 and joined Masaka Secondary School, completing his UCE exams in 1992. He would later enroll at Nakyenyi Senior Secondary School for his A 'level, finishing in 1994.

Mpuuga later joined Makerere University to study a Bachelor of Arts in Education course in 2009. He also holds an MA in economics from Makerere University and a Bachelors of Laws (LLB) degree he attained from the same university in 2016. He later enrolled at the Law Development Centre (LDC) graduating with a Postgraduate diploma in legal practice in 2020.

Employment and working experience 
Mpuuga was teacher at Uganda Martyrs High School, Rubaga, where he taught Geography and Economics from 1998 to 2003.

He was a director for Masaka Town College based in Masaka city from 2000 to 2002.

He was also a partner and managing director for Liberal Consult Ltd, an evaluation and monitoring firm that previously worked on contracts to monitor donor-funded projects in Uganda from 2001 to 2004.

Mpuuga was a principal and managing director for Datamine Technical Business School in Kampala from 2003 to 2011.

Mpuuga was a Youth Chairperson at Masaka District Local Government from 2000 to 2011.

Mpuuga is a member on the University Council of Mutesa I Royal University from 2010 to date.

Political career 
Mpuuga became active in politics in his first year at Makerere University. He was part of the group that founded Uganda Young Democrats (UYD), a youth wing of the opposition Democratic Party. He participated in the presidential campaigns of Paul Kawanga Ssemogerere in the 1996 General elections.

Mpuuga served as a member of the Buganda Kingdom Lukiiko (Parliament) between 1998 and 2010.

In 2011, he contested for election as Member of Parliament for Masaka Municipality.  He won the election and went on to represent Masaka until 2021.

During this period, he served as a member of the Public Accounts Committee (PAC) and the Appointments Committee - a committee of Parliament that vets Presidential appointees. He also served as Shadow Minister for the Presidency and Anti-corruption (2011 - 2016), and Shadow Minister for Education (2016 - 2021).

In 2021, he was elected as Member of Parliament representing Nyendo - Mukungwe Division. He was appointed Leader of Opposition in Parliament by the National Unity Platform (NUP).

References 

Living people
1975 births
Members of the Parliament of Uganda
Leaders of the Opposition (Uganda)
Makerere University alumni
National Unity Platform politicians
People from Lwengo District
Law Development Centre alumni
21st-century Ugandan educators
21st-century Ugandan lawyers
People from Masaka District